Drinking from the Sun, Walking Under Stars Restrung is a 2016 remix album from Australian hip hop group, Hilltop Hoods that follows their 2014 release Walking Under Stars and their 2012 release Drinking from the Sun. This is the second launch of a "restrung" album after The Hard Road: Restrung in 2007. The 19-track release features a collection of new tracks alongside singles such as "Cosby Sweater" and "I Love It". This is the second time Hilltop Hoods have collaborated with the 32-piece Adelaide Symphony Orchestra and one of many collaborations with arranger/composer Jamie Messager, but is the first collaboration with the 20-piece Adelaide Chamber Singer Choir and conductor Hamish Mackenzie. The song "Higher" is featured in Forza Horizon 3.

Coinciding with the album launch, Hilltop Hoods toured the Australian capital cities, they were accompanied by orchestras and choirs in those respective cities to bring the album to the people all across the nation. They were supported on tour by fellow Australian Hip-hop act A.B.Original and British pop singer and previous collaborator Maverick Sabre.

Track listing

Charts

Weekly charts

Year-end charts

Certifications

References

2016 remix albums
Hilltop Hoods albums